Ruzayevka (Orozaj; , Orazaj oš) is a town in the Republic of Mordovia, Russia, located on the Insar River,  southwest of Saransk. Population:

History
The first settlement on the site of the city was given to Uraza Tankacheev in 1631 by Russian king Michael Fedorovich, for faithful service.
The Tatar princes and murzas were owners of Ruzayevka up to 1715. For refusing to accept the Christian faith, these lands and serfs peasants were bequeathed to the great Emperor.

In 1725, the land and peasants were given to the Lieutenant Tikhon Lukin, who owned it for more than 30 years, and then went bankrupt and in 1757 sold it to the court Councilor Jeremiah Struysky.

For more than a hundred years (1757-1861) Ruzayevka belonged to rich landowners-feudals Struysky. On the spot where now is the high school number 9, there was a luxurious mansion.
With Nicholay Eremeevich Struysky, linked one of the pages in the history of Ruzayevka.

Nikolay Eremeevich settled in Ruzayevka in 1771. At that time he was 24 years old, he served 8 years in the Preobrazhensky regiment and retired with the rank of warrant officer guard. The estate bought by his father was located in lands and was rich by underground waters. Struysky invited famous architect V. V. Rastrelli to design the building and the Church . For the half year was built three-storey house-Palace. Nikolay Eremeevich lived there and wrote poetries, the third floor of his house was called "Parnassus". In 1783 he created in Ruzayevka private printing, in which peasants worked, that were trained to print in printing the Samara and Nizhny Novgorod. This printing was one of the best of its time, the printing house published mainly poems of Nikolay Eremeevich. These publications are extremely rare and they are of great bibliographic value.
In 1905, it became one of the centers of the revolutionary movement, supporting the uprising of Moscow workers. 10 (23) December 1905 under the leadership of the committee headed by the engineer of the locomotive depot Afanasiy Petrovich Baykuzov went on strike, which resulted in power in the village and the nearest railway station was taken over by the workers. There, the  "Ruzayevka Republic" was created, which lasted 12 days.

The railway station of Ruzayevka is mentioned in the poetry of the Latvian poet Alexander Chaks (Aleksandrs Čaks in the Latvian language) ''Touched by eternity'' (''Mūžības skartie''). The poetry is about Latvian military riflemen in return from the Russian Civil War in 1920.

Administrative and municipal status
Within the framework of administrative divisions, Ruzayevka serves as the administrative center of Ruzayevsky District, even though it is not a part of it. As an administrative division, it is incorporated separately as the town of republic significance of Ruzayevka—an administrative unit with the status equal to that of the districts. As a municipal division, the town of republic significance of Ruzayevka is incorporated within Ruzayevsky Municipal District as Ruzayevka Urban Settlement.

Symbol of the city
The symbol of the city is the locomotive Cuckoo placed at locomotive depot in memory of events of December in 1905 when Ruzayevka became one of the centers of revolutionary movement.

Economy
Ruzayevka is the second biggest industrial center of the republic after Saransk. Primary branches of the industry are mechanical engineering (Ruzkhimmash), vacuum tube mechanical engineering, instrumentation, food processing, and railway transportation.

Transportation
The town is a large railway hub of the Kuybyshev Railway.

Infrastructure
There are several museums in Ruzayevka:
Regional museum 
Railway museum 
A branch of the Mordovian art museum 

There are 8 libraries, a recreation center "Orion",
the cinema "Iskra", the swimming pool "Neptune" and the swimming pool "dolphin".
But the eldest and the most famous club in Ruzaevka is the club named after Ukhtomsky.

In 1952 residents of the city of Ruzaevka received a great gift – railway club, a magnificent building in the style of Stalin's Empire, which even now has no analogues in the Republic. The club was named after Alexey Vladimirovich Ukhtomskiy, the trainman, who committed the legendary feat – in 1905 he saved the train with the warriors from the fire of the executioners.
The club opened its doors to all residents of the city. All generations of citizens have been engaged in various clubs and societies . The prosperity of urban culture began in the distant 1960s, when Igor Aleksandrovich Peresleni, Nikolai Kiselev and many talented creative directors worked in the club.

The club was and still is a favorite place of citizens. Before you could watch a movie, there worked a national University with five faculties of the pedagogical and legal knowledge, culture, health. The library of the club consisted of 2500 readers. Famous for the drama club, from which came famous all over the country folk artists. there was very popular club brass band and orchestra of folk instruments. There were organized: choir of Russian song, dance clubs, art workshop and many clubs. From the first days of its existence the Club has become a symbol of the city.

We are proud of the people who are famous not only in our city and Republic, but beyond our city too. It is the artist of the Russian Federation and the Republic of Mordovia, laureate of the State prize of Republic of Mordovia, Honorary Citizen of Ruzaevka Alexandra Nikolaevna Kulikova; the artist of the Republic of Mordovia, laureate of the State prize of Republic of Mordovia, Honorary Citizen of Ruzaevka Lyubov Denisova; The honoured artist of the Republic of Mordovia Vladimir Ivanovich Sidorin, Honored worker of culture of Mordovia Anatoliy Batenkov.

In the 1970s there worked not less talented people. Their first creative steps did honored workers of culture of Mordovia Galina Stepanovna Sukhanova, Alexander Ryabov and Anatoliy Beniaminovich Markaryan.

Education
There are nine secondary schools, five children's schools of arts, an orphanage, five vocational schools, and Ruzayevsky Institute of Mechanical Engineering of Mordovian State University in Ruzayevka.

Health care
There are several hospitals in Ruzayevka, including Ruzayevsky Central Regional Hospital and Ruzayevka's Railway Central Hospital.

References

Notes

Sources

Cities and towns in Mordovia
Populated places established in 1631
1631 establishments in Russia
Ruzayevsky District
Insarsky Uyezd